John Blakeney may refer to:

 John Blakeney (priest) (1824–1895), Anglican priest
 John Blakeney (died 1747) (c. 1703–1747), Irish Member of Parliament
 John Blakeney (died 1781) (1756–1781), Irish Member of Parliament
 John Blakeney (died 1789) (c. 1729–1789), Irish soldier and politician
 John Blakeney (Irish judge) (died 1438), Irish Chief Justice